The 3rd Asia Pacific Screen Awards were held in  2009.

Winners and nominees
Winners are listed first and in bold.

Best Feature Film
Samson & Delilah
The Time that Remains
About Elly
City of Life and Death
Forever Enthralled

Best Youth Feature Film
A Brand New Life
Tahaan: A Boy with a Granade
The Strength of Water
Pesantren: 3 Wishes 3 Loves
Mommo the Bogeyman

Best Animated Feature Film
Mary and Max
The Tale of Soldier Fedot, The Daring Fellow
Summer Wars
The Sky Crawlers
First Squad: The Moment of Truth

Best Documentary Feature Film
Defamation
Survive, in the heart of the Khmer Rouge madness
Mental
Gandhi's Children
Citizen Juling

Achievement in Cinematography
Cao Yu (City of Life and Death)
Alexei Arsentiev (Wolfy)
Alisher Khamidhodjaev and Maxim Drozdov (Paper Soldier)
Ali Mohammad Ghasemi (A Light in the Fog)
Uruphong Raksasad (Agrarian Utopia)

Achievement in Directing
Lu Chuan (City of Life and Death)
Sion Sono (Love Exposure)
Anurag Kashyap (Dev.D)
Vimukthi Jayasundara (Between Two Worlds)
Asghar Farhadi (About Elly)

Best Screenplay
Asghar Farhadi (About Elly)
Yogesh Vinayak Joshi and Upendra Sidhaye (Mumbai My Life)
Bong Joon-ho and Park Eun-kyo (Mother)
Baek Seung-Bin (Members of the Funeral)
Kundo Koyama (Departures)

Best Performance by an Actress
Kim Hye-ja (Mother)
Zhou Xun (The Equation of Love and Death)
Yana Troyanova (Wolfy)
Malani Fonseka (Flowers of the Sky)
Golshifteh Farahani (About Elly)

Best Performance by an Actor
Masahiro Motoki (Departures)
Ge You (If You Are the One)
Naseeruddin Shah (A Wednesday!)
Mohamed Bakri (Laila's Birthday)
Yang Ik-june (Breathless)

FIAPF Award
Isao Matsuoka

UNESCO Award
Uruphong Raksasad (Agrarian Utopia)

Jury Grand Prize
The Time That Remains
About Elly

References

Asia Pacific Screen Awards
Asia Pacific Screen Awards